Radovan Marković (born March 11, 1982) is a Serbian professional basketball coach and former player who played at the shooting guard position. He is currently working as assistant coach for CSM Oradea of the Liga Națională.

External links
 Eurobasket.com Profile 
 Eurocup Profile

1982 births
Living people
Basketball players from Belgrade
CSM Oradea (basketball) players
KK Vojvodina Srbijagas players
KK Tamiš players
KK Lavovi 063 players
KK Lions/Swisslion Vršac players
Serbian expatriate basketball people in Germany
Serbian expatriate basketball people in Romania
Serbian men's basketball players
Shooting guards
Telekom Baskets Bonn players
Tigers Tübingen players